Don't Move Here: Inside Portland's Music Scene is an American documentary series about Portland, Oregon's music scene, that relatively recently has become a hot spot for indie bands. The series was created by director and curator Aaron Rose and produced by Wieden+Kennedy Entertainment.

The series features interviews with Portland-based artists, musicians and record label producers, as well as concert footage taken at various underground and less known music venues. Bands, labels and studios profiled so far include Yacht, Grouper, Honey Owens, Jackie-O Motherfucker Mississippi Studios, Rev. Shines, Libretto, Marriage Records, Rob Walmart, States Rights Records, Type Foundry, Jackpot Studios, Explode Into Colors, White Fang, Mississippi Records and Portland Mayor Sam Adams.

In 2010 the series's first season was nominated for the 14th Annual Webby Awards in the music category.

Episode Synopsis

Season 1

Season 2

See also 
 Tom McCall, a former Oregon governor who popularized the notion of "don't move here" in 1971.

References

External links
 Season 1 on Vimeo
 Season 2 on Vimeo
 Show summary and credits

American documentary films
Documentary films about rock music and musicians
Wieden+Kennedy
Culture of Portland, Oregon